Bambamarca or Pampamarka (Quechua pampa a large plain, marka village) is one of six districts of Bolívar Province, Peru.

References